

League notes
Brandon granted a leave of absence.
The Stratton brothers Art and Gord set a league record for most points (76) in a single season.

Playoffs
Turnbull Cup Championship
Monarchs defeated Barons 4-games-to-1
Western Memorial Cup Semi-Final
Monarchs  defeated Fort William Canadiens (TBJHL) 4-games-to-3
Western Memorial Cup Final (Abbott Cup)
Monarchs lost to Regina Pats (WCJHL) 4-games-to-1

Awards

All-Star Teams

References 
Manitoba Junior Hockey League
Manitoba Hockey Hall of Fame
Hockey Hall of Fame
Winnipeg Free Press Archives
Brandon Sun Archives

MJHL
Manitoba Junior Hockey League seasons